Birgitt "Biggi" Bender (born 28 December 1956 in Düsseldorf) is a German politician and member of Alliance 90/The Greens in the Bundestag.

Bender studied law in Cologne, Geneva and in Freiburg and finished her studies 1984.

From 1988 to 2001 Bender was a member of the Landtag of Baden-Württemberg in Stuttgart. Since 2002 Bender has been a member of the Bundestag in Berlin. She is openly lesbian.

She contested the 2009 election in the Stuttgart II district, but was unsuccessful.

References

External links 
 Official website  

1956 births
Living people
Politicians from Düsseldorf
Members of the Bundestag for Baden-Württemberg
Female members of the Bundestag
Lesbian politicians
University of Cologne alumni
University of Geneva alumni
University of Freiburg alumni
Members of the Landtag of Baden-Württemberg
LGBT members of the Bundestag
21st-century German women politicians
Members of the Bundestag 2009–2013
Members of the Bundestag 2005–2009
Members of the Bundestag 2002–2005
Members of the Bundestag for Alliance 90/The Greens
21st-century German LGBT people